Mike Love Not War, is an Anglosphere counterculture reference to U.S. musician Mike Love and may refer to:
Mike Love Not War (EP), an extended play by the band Smudge
Mike Love Not War (album), an early title for what became Mike Love's album Unleash the Love

See also
Mike Love, U.S. musician
Make love, not war, an anti-war slogan commonly associated with the American counterculture of the 1960s